Don Martin Mankiewicz (January 20, 1922 – April 25, 2015) was an American screenwriter and novelist best known for his novel, Trial.

Early life
Born in Berlin, Germany, he was the son of Sara (née Aaronson) and the screenwriter Herman J. Mankiewicz and brother of journalist Frank Mankiewicz. He graduated from Columbia College of Columbia University in 1942.

Career
His 1955 novel Trial won the Harper Prize and was made into a film of the same name.  He was nominated for an Academy Award for Best Adapted Screenplay for I Want to Live! (1958). Among his many television credits are Ironside, for which he wrote the pilot, the Star Trek episode "Court Martial", and the mini-series adaptation of President John F. Kennedy's book, Profiles in Courage.

Personal life
Mankiewicz married Ilene Korsen on March 26, 1946 and divorced her in 1972. He married Carol Bell Guidi on July 1, 1972. Mankiewicz had 2 children with Ilene (Jane and John). He had two children with Carol (Jan and Sandy). His son is a screenwriter and producer, John Mankiewicz. Jane is a fiction writer published in the New Yorker.

Death
Mankiewicz died on April 25, 2015 at his home in Monrovia, California at the age of 93  of congestive heart failure. He is survived by his wife of 40 years and his 4 children.

Novels
 See How They Run (1951)
 Trial (1955)
 It Only Hurts a Minute (1966)

Filmography

Films

Television

See also
Mankiewicz family

References

External links
 
 Don M. Mankiewicz at Memory Alpha
 Obituary

1922 births
2015 deaths
American people of German-Jewish descent
20th-century American novelists
American male screenwriters
Mankiewicz family
Writers from Berlin
American male television writers
American male novelists
American television writers
20th-century American male writers
Columbia College (New York) alumni
German emigrants to the United States